The Caroline Springs Football Club, also known as the Lakers, is an Australian rules football club based in Caroline Springs, an outer suburb of Melbourne, Australia. The club has competed in the Western Region Football League (WRFL) since 2011. They are based in the Melbourne suburb of Caroline Springs.

History
On 15 May 2002 Mark Penaluna, the General Manager of the WRFL and other officials met with principals of local schools to discuss developing the game of football in the Caroline Springs area. From this meeting it was decided to hold a public interest meeting on 19 June 2002. With such a great turnout, it was obvious that the people wanted a club in Caroline Springs.

A steering committee was formed and met every two weeks from then onwards to incorporate the Caroline Springs Football Club. A relationship was developed with the Williamstown (VFL) &  to help develop football in the area. The steering committee agreed that the club colours will be those of the two clubs being Black, White, Royal Blue & Gold.

Developers of the Caroline Springs community, Delfin, also agreed to assist financially to help the club with their start-up costs.

The club started fielding sides in the WRFL underage competitions. As the players got older the club started fielding sides in the older age group. Finally in 2011 the Club fielded their first open aged team in the WRFL Division 2 competition. The club won 4 games in its initial year. It won six games in 2012.

Team Song (lyrics)
Oh, we're from Caroline Springs,

The mighty Lakers

We're from Caroline Springs

In any weather you will see us with a grin (HEY)

Risking head and shin (HEY)

If we're behind then never mind we'll fight and fight and win

For we're from Caroline Springs

We'll never weaken until the final siren's gone

Like the Lakers of old

We're strong and we're bold

We are the yellow, blue, white and black

We are the Laker boys and girls.

Bibliography
 History of football in Melbourne's north west by John Stoward –

References

External links
Official website

Australian rules football clubs in Melbourne
Australian rules football clubs established in 2002
2002 establishments in Australia
Western Region Football League clubs
Sport in the City of Melton